Drawing Express is a CAD software application for 2D and 3D design and drafting. It is used primarily by architects and builders, but the tools and commands present on the system can be adopted for use by landscape designers, surveyors, civil and construction engineers. The software is developed, sold and supported by the British company 'Trial Systems Ltd' based in Burton-upon-Trent, Staffordshire. The software was first released in 1994, developed by Peter Boyce & Steven Pearce in conjunction with Anton Heymann. The software is based around a tablet and pen interface. A graphics tablet, pen and overlay are used to select, use and manipulate commands thus mimicking the draughtsman's drawing board. This differs from the traditional CAD software ‘drop-down’ menu structures on-screen as the menu system is laid out in front of the user. The method of drawing in this way is aimed at being intuitive allowing the user to create and amend drawings as quickly as possible.

Versions and 3D

Versions

There are two separate versions of the software aside from the standard Drawing Express package:

 Drawing Express Timber Frame - In-built module for Drawing Express which produces panel detail drawings and cutting lists for timber frame buildings.
 Drawing Express Underfloor Heating - In-built module for Drawing Express which aids in designing water and electrical based systems. Automatic commands within Drawing Express create these systems. Cable lengths are automatically calculated and layouts can be modified.

3D

A 3D model can be created while displaying it in rendered  mode in 'real time'. The 3D model is automatically created from the 2D plans including all walls, openings, and roof. Other information can be added to the model such as sky, landscaping, people and cars for detail. The model can be exported to POV-Ray and rendered off inside the raytracer software giving more resolution and detail.

Platforms and license types

Supported platforms

Drawing Express is Windows based software which runs on Windows 2000, XP, Vista, Windows 7, Windows 8 and Windows 10 . The software works on 32-bit and 64-bit versions of the Windows operating system.

Drawing Express can be run on a Mac with Windows installed. This is possible on any Intel based Mac running OS X 10.5, 10.6, 10.7 or 10.8 versions of the Mac OS X operating system, through the use of VMware Fusion or Parallels Desktop- virtual machine software. Drawing Express can also be installed on a Bootcamp partition.

License types 

Drawing Express requires a USB dongle to be present on the system it is running on. This is the license for the software and without a dongle present on the system, the program will not open or save drawings.

Data interchange 

Drawing Express drawing files use a .EXP file extension. The software can import and export DWG and DXF files amongst others. In version 2021, PDF files can be imported as drawings. Drawings can also be saved to PDF format using any available PDF converter. Images can be imported and exported. Importing works with most mainstream image file formats.

Version history 

 1994 - Drawing Express (DOS)
 1998 - Drawing Express for Windows
 2000 - Drawing Express 2010
 2001 - Drawing Express 2011
 2003 - Drawing Express 2012
 2004 - Drawing Express 2013
 2005 - Drawing Express 2014
 2007 - Drawing Express 2015
 2008 - Drawing Express 2016
 2009 - Drawing Express 2017
 2011 - Drawing Express 2018
 2013 - Drawing Express 2019
 2015 - Drawing Express 2020
 2017 - Drawing Express 2021
 2019 - Drawing Express 2022
 2021 - Drawing Express 2023

See also 
CAD
Comparison of CAD Software
Comparison of CAD editors for CAE

References

External links 
Drawing Express Webpage
Trial Systems Ltd
CAD Essence
William Sutherland Architect, CAD - a basic guide

Computer-aided design software
Computer-aided design software for Windows
3D graphics software
1994 software